Goya albivenella is a species of snout moth in the genus Goya. It was described by Émile Louis Ragonot in 1888. It is found in Argentina where it was "described from Goya, Corrientes, Argentia".

References

Moths described in 1888
Anerastiini
Moths of South America
Taxa named by Émile Louis Ragonot